Dietsch, Dietsche or Dietschy is a surname of Middle Dutch, Afrikaans and Flemish-Belgian origin, meaning "The (Germanic) peoples". Notable people with the surname include:

 Guillaume Dietsch, French footballer
 Mike Dietsch, Canadian politician
 Pierre-Louis Dietsch, French composer
 Waltraud Dietsch, German sprinter